Hello is the sixth studio album recorded by Canadian pop rock band Hedley. It was released via Universal Music Canada on November 6, 2015. It debuted atop the Billboard Canadian Albums Chart, becoming the group's first chart-topper, and has since spawned two top-40 singles, "Hello" and "Lose Control".

Composition and release
Lead singer Jacob Hoggard is credited as a writer, record producer, and creative director for the album. Other producers include Brian Howes and Jason Van Poederooyen. Canadian songwriter Ryan Stewart, known for his work with Carly Rae Jepsen and Suzie McNeil, also co-wrote five tracks on the album.

The album became available for pre-order on iTunes on September 8, 2015 in conjunction with the digital release of "Lost in Translation". Hello was released in digital and physical formats, in both a standard and deluxe edition, and was also available as a vinyl box set. All versions were scheduled for release in Canada on November 6, 2015 via Universal Music Canada. The album was released in the US through Capitol Records on November 6, 2015. The album sold 14,500 copies in its first week.

Singles
"Lost in Translation" was released on September 8, 2015 as the lead single off the album. The song failed to enter the Billboard Canadian Hot 100, becoming their first single to miss the chart since it was established in 2007. It has, however, impacted the Canada CHR/Top 40 and Canada Hot AC airplay charts monitored by Billboard through Nielsen BDS Radio.

The title track, "Hello", was released October 9, 2015 as the second official single. It was promoted to Canadian adult contemporary radio in lieu of "Lost in Translation" as the lead single for that format.

"Lose Control" was serviced to Canadian radio on March 4, 2016 as the album's third official single.

"Can't Slow Down" was released to iTunes on October 2, 2015 as the first promotional single off the album. An official audio visualizer was uploaded to the band's Vevo account on the same day. In August 2016 it was serviced to radio as the record's fourth official single.

Track listing

Notes
 signifies an additional record producer

Credits and personnel
Credits adapted from Hello album liner notes.

 Hedley
 Vocals, acoustic guitar, piano, keyboards, percussion – Jacob Hoggard
 Guitars, background vocals – Dave Rosin
 Bass, background vocals – Tommy MacDonald
 Drums, background vocals – Chris Crippin

Recorded and engineered at
 Vancouver, British Columbia 
 Studio City, Los Angeles, CA 
Mixed at
 New York City, NY 

Performance credits

 Additional vocals – Allie Sheldan 
 Background vocals – Brian Howes 
 Guitar – Brian Howes
 Piano, clavinova – James Jannetty

 Bass, drum programming, keyboards, keyboard programming, piano, Rhodes, wurli – Jon Levine
 Keyboards – Jason Van Poederooyen
 Guitar – Jon Sosin
 Keyboards – Ryan Stewart

Production

 A&R – Shawn Marino, Darren Gilmore
 Booking – The Feldman Agency
 Art director – Garnet Armstrong
 Creative director – Jacob Hoggard
 Engineers – Ben Kaplan, Jason Van Poederooyen, Nolan Sipe
 Assistant engineer – Dan Piscina
 Manager – Dale Matheson Carr-Hilton Labonte LLP
 Managing organization – Watchdog Management
 Mastering – Ted Jensen

 Mixer – Jason Van Poederooyen
 Record producers – Jacob Hoggard, Brian Howes, Jon Levine, Jason Van Poederooyen, Nolan Sipe 
 Additional producers – Jarett Holmes
 Programming – Jacob Hoggard
 Additional programming – Jason Van Poederooyen
 Songwriters – Jacob Hoggard, Jarett Holmes, Brian Howes, Jon Levine, Anjulie Persaud, Jason Van Poederooyen, Alleson Sheldan, Nolan Sipe, Ryan Stewart
 Photographer – Raina + Wilson
 Photo illustration – Brad Pickard

Charts and certifications

Album

Weekly charts

Year end charts

Singles

Certifications

References

2015 albums
Hedley (band) albums
Universal Music Canada albums